Eli Adams (born 12 March 2002), is an Australian professional soccer player who played as a midfielder for Brisbane Roar.
 
On 28th June 2022 Eli signed for A League Club Melbourne Victory.

References

External links

2002 births
Living people
Australian soccer players
Association football midfielders
Melbourne Victory FC players
National Premier Leagues players
A-League Men players